The 1898–99 Cornell Big Red men's basketball team represented Cornell University during the 1898–99 college men's basketball season. The team finished with a final record of 1–3.

Schedule

|-

References

Cornell Big Red men's basketball seasons
Cornell
Cornell Big Red
Cornell Big Red